= BFF (manga) =

Japanese manga series

- First tankōbon volume cover
- Genre: Comedy
- Manga
- Written by: Oto Obana
- Published by: Shogakukan
- Imprint: Manga One Comics
- Magazine: MangaONE; Ura Sunday
- Original run: August 17, 2024 – present
- Volumes: 4

BFF is a Japanese manga series written and illustrated by Oto Obana. It began serialization on Shogakukan's MangaONE and Ura Sunday websites in August 2024.

== Synopsis ==
Aizawa, a college student with a part-time job at a café, has feelings for his co-worker Risa Shiomi but is unable to confess due to his social anxiety. One day, he witnesses Risa being flustered by the manager of the café, Rion Shirakane, and feeling a sense of inferiority he quits. However, Rion pulls him back and offers to be friends with Aizawa.

== Publication ==
Written and illustrated by Oto Obana, BFF began serialization on Shogakukan's MangaONE and Ura Sunday websites on August 17, 2024. Its chapters have been compiled into four tankōbon volumes as of August 2026.

No.	Release date	ISBN
1	February 19, 2025	978-4-09-853867-6
2	July 17, 2025	978-4-09-854184-3
3	December 19, 2025	978-4-09-854354-0
4	August 19, 2026	978-4-09-854725-8

== Reception ==
The series was ranked fourteenth in the Nationwide Bookstore Employees' Recommended Comics list of 2026. The series was ranked fourth in the seventh Sanyodo Bookstore Comic Awards in 2026. The series was nominated for the twelfth Next Manga Award in 2026 in the web category.
